Muhammad Ferarri  (born 21 June 2003) is an Indonesian professional footballer who plays as a centre back for Liga 1 club Persija Jakarta and the Indonesian national team.

Club career

Persija Jakarta
Ferarri made his first-team debut for Persija Jakarta on 24 September 2021 in a match against Persela Lamongan at the Pakansari Stadium in the 2021 Liga 1 season.

International career
On 30 May 2022, Ferarri made his debut for the Indonesian U-20 team against Venezuela at the 2022 Maurice Revello Tournament in France.

On 10 July 2022, Ferarri scored a brace against Myanmar U-20 in the 2022 AFF U-19 Youth Championship in a 5–1 win.

On 18 September 2022, Ferarri captained the national under-20 football team in a 3–2 win at the 2023 AFC U-20 Asian Cup qualification against the Vietnam U-20. He scored an own-goal to bring the tie 1-1, and later equalized with a header to bring the score at 2-2. Indonesia eventually won 3-2 and qualified for the 2023 AFC U-20 Asian Cup as Group F Winner in the 2023 AFC U-20 Asian Cup qualification.

In September 2022, Ferarri received a call up to the senior team for a friendly match against Curacao. On 27 September 2022, Ferrari made his first senior cap in a 2-1 win.

In November 2022, it was reported that Ferarri received a call-up from the Indonesia for a training camp, in preparation for the 2022 AFF Championship.

Career statistics

Club

Notes

International

International goals
International under-20 goals

Honours

Club 
 Persija Jakarta
 Menpora Cup: 2021

Individual
 Liga 1 Young Player of the Month: August 2022

References

External links
 Muhammad Ferarri at Soccerway
 Muhammad Ferarri at Liga Indonesia

2003 births
Living people
Sportspeople from Jakarta
Indonesian footballers
Liga 1 (Indonesia) players
Persija Jakarta players
Association football defenders
Indonesia youth international footballers
Indonesia international footballers
21st-century Indonesian people